Peter Ballauff (born 29 September 1963) is a former professional tennis player from West Germany.

Career
Ballauff was primarily a doubles player but did reach the singles quarter-finals at Palermo in 1989. En route he defeated world number 21 Andrés Gómez.

At the same event, he won the doubles title, partnering Rüdiger Haas.

He made one appearance in a Grand Slam tournament, which was the 1990 Australian Open, with Swede Lars-Anders Wahlgren as his partner. They were defeated in the opening round by Darren Cahill and Mark Kratzmann in a close match, which ended in a 10–8 final set scoreline.

Grand Prix career finals

Doubles: 1 (1–0)

Challenger titles

Doubles: (2)

References

1963 births
Living people
West German male tennis players
German male tennis players
Tennis players from Hamburg
20th-century German people